The Centrism was a political formula that inspired the Atlanticist, anti-communist, and centrist governments of the Italian Republic between the end of the 1940s and the early 1950s. The governments of this period, also known as "The Years of Centrism" (Gli Anni del Centrismo), were characterized by a coalition pact between the Christian Democracy (DC) and the other minor secular parties.

History

The 1948 Italian general election were heavily influenced by the cold-war confrontation between the Soviet Union and the United States. After the Soviet-inspired February 1948 Communist coup in Czechoslovakia, the United States became alarmed about Soviet intentions and feared that, if the leftist coalition were to win the elections, the Soviet-funded Italian Communist Party (PCI) would draw Italy into the Soviet Union's sphere of influence. The Christian Democrat political campaign said that, in Communist countries, "children send parents to jail", "children are owned by the state", "people eat their own children", and assured voters that disaster would strike Italy if the left were to take power. Another slogan was, "In the secrecy of the polling booth, God sees you – Stalin doesn't."

The Christian Democrats won a resounding victory with 48.5% of the vote (their best result ever) and large majorities in both the Chamber of Deputies and Senate. The Communists received only half of the votes they had in 1946. Although Alcide De Gasperi could have formed an exclusively Christian Democratic government, he instead formed a centrist coalition with Italian Liberal Party (PLI), Italian Republican Party (PRI), and Italian Democratic Socialist Party (PSDI). De Gasperi formed three ministries, the second one in 1950 after the defection of the Liberals, who hoped for more right-wing policies, and the third one in 1951 after the defection of the Social-democrats, who hoped for more leftist policies. He ruled for five more years, helming four additional coalitions. According to the foreign news correspondent for The New York Times, Anne O'Hare McCormick, "De Gasperi's policy is patience. He seems to be feeling his way among the explosive problems he has to deal with, but perhaps this wary mine-detecting method is the stabilizing force that holds the country in balance."

The 1953 Italian general election was characterised by changes in the electoral law. Even if the general structure remained uncorrupted, the government introduced a majority bonus system of two thirds of seats in the Chamber for the coalition which would obtain at-large the absolute majority of votes. The change was strongly opposed by the opposition parties, as well as the DC's smaller coalition partners, who had no realistic chance of success under this system. The new law was called the Scam Law (Legge truffa) by its detractors, including some dissidents of minor government parties who founded special opposition groups to deny the artificial landslide to DC.

The campaign of the opposition to the Scam Law achieved its goal. The centrist coalition (DC, PSDI, PLI, PRI, SVP, PSd'Az) won 49.9% of national vote, resulting in an ordinary proportional distribution of the seats. Minor dissident parties resulted determinant for the final result, especially the short-lived National Democratic Alliance. The leading party, Christian Democracy, did not repeat the result of five years earlier, which had been obtained under special conditions linked to the Cold War, and lost a lot of votes to the right, including resurgent fascist politicians particularly in Southern Italy.

Technically, the government won the election, winning a majority of seats in both houses. But the frustration with the lack of a supermajority caused significant tensions in the leading coalition. De Gasperi was forced to resign by the Italian Parliament on 2 August; De Gasperi consequently retired and died twelve months later. The legislature continued with weak governments, with minor parties refusing institutional responsibilities. Giuseppe Pella rose to power but fell after only five months, following heated disputes about the status of the Free Territory of Trieste which Pella was claiming. Amintore Fanfani's succeeding first ministry failed to receive a vote of confidence in Parliament, whilst Mario Scelba and Antonio Segni followed with more traditional centrist coalitions supported by Social democrats and Liberals: under the administration of Scelba, the problem of Trieste was settled by ceding Koper to Yugoslavia. The parliamentary term was seen out by the minority government chaired by Adone Zoli, finishing a legislature which hugely weakened the office of the Prime Minister, held by six different leaders.

Political parties

Electoral results

Chamber of Deputies

Senate

References

Defunct political party alliances in Italy